The Cessna 172 Skyhawk is an American four-seat, single-engine, high wing, fixed-wing aircraft made by the Cessna Aircraft Company. First flown in 1955, more 172s have been built than any other aircraft. It was developed from the 1948 Cessna 170 but with tricycle landing gear rather than conventional landing gear. The Skyhawk name was originally used for a trim package, but was later applied to all standard-production 172 aircraft, while some upgraded versions were marketed as the Cutlass.

Measured by its longevity and popularity, the Cessna 172 is the most successful aircraft in history. The aircraft remains in production today.

A general aviation airplane, the Skyhawk's main competitors have been the Beechcraft Musketeer and Grumman AA-5 series (neither currently in production), the Piper Cherokee, and, more recently, the Diamond DA40 and Cirrus SR20.

Design and development

The Cessna 172 started life as a tricycle landing gear variant of the taildragger Cessna 170, with a basic level of standard equipment. In January 1955, Cessna flew an improved variant of the Cessna 170, a Continental O-300-A-powered Cessna 170C with larger elevators and a more angular tailfin. Although the variant was tested and certified, Cessna decided to modify it with a tricycle landing gear, and the modified Cessna 170C flew again on June 12, 1955. To reduce the time and cost of certification, the type was added to the Cessna 170 type certificate as the Model 172. Later, the 172 was given its own type certificate. The 172 became an overnight sales success, and over 1,400 were built in 1956, its first full year of production.

Early 172s were similar in appearance to the 170s, with the same straight aft fuselage and tall landing gear legs, although the 172 had a straight tailfin while the 170 had a rounded fin and rudder. In 1960, the 172A incorporated revised landing gear and the swept-back tailfin, which is still in use today.

The final aesthetic development, found in the 1963 172D and all later 172 models, was a lowered rear deck allowing an aft window. Cessna advertised this added rear visibility as "Omni-Vision."

Production halted in the mid-1980s, but resumed in 1996 with the 160 hp (120 kW) Cessna 172R Skyhawk. Cessna supplemented this in 1998 with the 180 hp (135 kW) Cessna 172S Skyhawk SP.

Modifications
The Cessna 172 may be modified via a wide array of supplemental type certificates (STCs), including increased engine power and higher gross weights. Other modifications include additional fuel tank capacity in the wing tips, added baggage compartment tanks, added wheel pants to reduce drag, or enhanced landing and takeoff performance and safety with a STOL kit. The 172 has also been equipped with the  fuel injected Superior Air Parts Vantage engine.

Operational history

World records

From December 4, 1958, to February 7, 1959, Robert Timm and John Cook set the world record for (refueled) flight endurance in a used Cessna 172, registration number N9172B. They took off from McCarran Field (now Harry Reid International Airport) in Las Vegas, Nevada, and landed back at McCarran Field after 64 days, 22 hours, 19 minutes and 5 seconds in a flight covering an estimated 150,000 miles, over 6 times further than flying around the world at the equator. The flight was part of a fund-raising effort for the Damon Runyon Cancer Fund. The aircraft is now on display at the airport.

Variants

Cessna has historically used model years similar to a U.S. auto manufacturer, with sales of new models typically starting a few months prior to the actual calendar year.
172

The basic 172 appeared in November 1955 as the 1956 model and remained in production until replaced by the 172A in early 1960. Introductory base price was US$8,995 and a total of 4,195 were constructed over the five years.

172A
The 1960 model 172A introduced a swept-back tailfin and rudder, as well as float fittings. The price was US$9,450 and 1,015 were built.

172B

The 172B was introduced in late 1960 as the 1961 model and featured a shorter landing gear, engine mounts lengthened three inches (76 mm), a reshaped cowling, and a pointed propeller spinner. For the first time, the "Skyhawk" name was applied to an available deluxe option package. This added optional equipment included full exterior paint to replace the standard partial paint stripes and standard avionics.

172C
The 1962 model was the 172C. It brought to the line an optional autopilot and a key starter to replace the previous pull-starter. The seats were redesigned to be six-way adjustable. A child seat was made optional to allow two children to be carried in the baggage area. The 1962 price was US$9,895. A total of 889 172C models were produced.

172D

The 1963 172D model introduced the lower rear fuselage with a wraparound Omni-Vision rear window and a one-piece windshield. New rudder and brake pedals were also added. 1,146 172Ds were built.

1963 also saw the introduction of the 172D Powermatic, powered by a  Continental GO-300E, increasing cruise speed by  relative to the standard 172D. In reality this was not a new model, but rather a Cessna 175 Skylark that had been rebranded to overcome a reputation for poor engine reliability. The ploy was unsuccessful and neither the Powermatic nor the Skylark were produced again after the 1963 model year.

172E
The 172E was the 1964 model. The electrical fuses were replaced with circuit breakers. The 172E also featured a redesigned instrument panel. 1,401 172Es were built that year as production continued to increase.

The 1965 model 172F introduced electrically operated flaps to replace the previous lever-operated system. It was built in France by Reims Cessna as the F172 until 1971.  These models formed the basis for the U.S. Air Force's T-41A Mescalero primary trainer, which was used during the 1960s and early 1970s as initial flight screening aircraft in USAF Undergraduate Pilot Training (UPT).  Following their removal from the UPT program, some extant USAF T-41s were assigned to the U.S. Air Force Academy for the cadet pilot indoctrination program, while others were distributed to Air Force aero clubs.

A total of 1,436 172Fs were completed.

172G

The 1966 model year 172G introduced a more pointed spinner and sold for US$12,450 in its basic 172 version and US$13,300 in the upgraded Skyhawk version. 1,597 were built.

172H
The 1967 model 172H was the last Continental O-300 powered model. It also introduced a shorter-stroke nose gear oleo to reduce drag and improve the appearance of the aircraft in flight. A new cowling was used, introducing shock-mounts that transmitted lower noise levels to the cockpit and reduced cowl cracking. The electric stall warning horn was replaced by a pneumatic one.

The 1967 model 172H sold for US$10,950 while the Skyhawk version was US$12,750. A total of 839 172Hs were built.

172I

The 1968 model marked the beginning of the Lycoming-powered 172s.

The increased power resulted in an increase in optimal cruise from  TAS to  TAS (true airspeed).

The 172I also introduced the first standard "T" instrument arrangement. The 172I saw an increase in production over the "H" model, with 1,206 built.

172J
For 1968, Cessna planned to replace the 172 with a newly designed aircraft called the 172J, featuring the same general configuration but with a more sloping windshield, a strutless cantilever wing, a more stylish interior, and various other improvements. However, the popularity of the previous 172 with Cessna dealers and flight schools prompted the cancellation of the replacement plan, and the 172J was instead introduced as the 177 and sold alongside the 172. The 172J designation was never used for a production aircraft.

The next model year was the 1969 "K" model. The 1969 172K had a redesigned tailfin cap and reshaped rear windows. Optional long-range  wing fuel tanks were offered. The 1969 model sold for US$12,500 for the 172 and US$13,995 for the Skyhawk, with 1,170 made.

The 1970 model was still called the 172K, but sported fiberglass, downward-shaped, conical wing tips. Fully articulated seats were offered as well. Production in 1970 was 759 units.

The 172L, sold during 1971 and 1972, replaced the main landing gear legs (which were originally flat spring steel) with tapered, tubular steel gear legs. The new tubular gear was lighter, but required aerodynamic fairings to maintain the same speed and climb performance as experienced with the flat steel design. The "L" also had a plastic fairing between the dorsal fin and vertical fin to introduce a greater family resemblance to the 182's vertical fin.

The 1971 model sold for US$13,425 in the 172 version and US$14,995 in the Skyhawk version. 827 172Ls were sold in 1971 and 984 in 1972.

The 172M of 1973–76 gained a drooped wing leading edge for improved low-speed handling. This was marketed as the "camber-lift" wing.

The 1974 172M was also the first to introduce the optional 'II' package which offered higher standard equipment, including a second nav/comm radio, an ADF and transponder. The baggage compartment was increased in size, and nose-mounted dual landing lights were available as an option.

In 1976, Cessna stopped marketing the aircraft as the 172 and began exclusively using the "Skyhawk" designation. This model year also saw a redesigned instrument panel to hold more avionics. Among other changes, the fuel and other small gauges were relocated to the left side for improved pilot readability compared with the earlier 172 panel designs. Total production of "M" models was 7306 over the four years it was manufactured.

The Skyhawk N, or Skyhawk/100 as Cessna termed it, was introduced for the 1977 model year. The "100" designation indicated that it was powered by a Lycoming O-320-H2AD,  engine designed to run on 100-octane fuel, whereas all previous engines used 80/87 fuel. But this engine proved troublesome and it was replaced by the similarly rated O-320-D2J to create the 1981 172P.

The 1977 "N" model 172 also introduced rudder trim as an option and standard "pre-selectable" flaps. The price was US$22,300, with the  selling for US$29,950.

The 1978 model brought a 28-volt electrical system to replace the previous 14-volt system. Air conditioning was an option.

The "N" remained in production until 1980 when the 172P or Skyhawk P was introduced.

172O
There was no "O" ("Oscar") model 172, to avoid confusion with the number zero.

The 172P, or Skyhawk P, was introduced in 1981 to solve the reliability problems of the "N" engine by replacing it with the Lycoming O-320-D2J.

A wet wing was optional, with a capacity of 62 US gallons of fuel.

The price of a new Skyhawk P was US$33,950, with the Skyhawk  costing US$37,810 and the Nav/Pac equipped Skyhawk  selling for US$42,460.

In 1982, the "P" saw the landing lights moved from the nose to the wing to increase bulb life. The 1983 model added some minor soundproofing improvements and thicker windows.

A second door latch pin was introduced in 1984.

Production of the "P" ended in 1986, and no more 172s were built for eleven years as legal liability rulings in the US had pushed Cessna's insurance costs too high, resulting in dramatically increasing prices for new aircraft.

There were only 195 172s built in 1984, a rate of fewer than four per week.

Production ended after only three years when all 172 production stopped.

This is the first Cessna 172 to have a factory-fitted fuel-injected engine.

This model year introduced many improvements, including a new interior with soundproofing, an all new multi-level ventilation system, a standard four point intercom, contoured, energy absorbing, 26g front seats with vertical and reclining adjustments and inertia reel harnesses.

The Cessna 172S was introduced in 1998 and is powered by a Lycoming IO-360-L2A producing . The maximum engine rpm was increased from 2,400 rpm to 2,700 rpm resulting in a  increase over the "R" model. This model is marketed under the name Skyhawk SP, although the Type Certification data sheet specifies it is a 172S.

The 172S is built primarily for the private owner-operator and is, in its later years, offered with the Garmin G1000 avionics package and leather seats as standard equipment.

, only the S model is in production.

Cessna 172RG Cutlass

Cessna introduced a retractable landing gear version of the 172 in 1980 and named it the Cutlass 172RG.

The 172RG did not find wide acceptance in the personal aircraft market because of higher initial and operating costs accompanied by mediocre cruising speed, but was adopted by many flight schools since it met the specific requirements for "complex aircraft" experience necessary to obtain a Commercial Pilot certificate (the role for which it was intended), at relatively low cost. Between 1980 and 1984 1,177 RGs were built, with a small number following before production ceased in 1985.

While numbered and marketed as a 172, the 172RG was actually certified on the Cessna 175 type certificate.

Special versions 
Reims FR172 and Cessna R172K Hawk XP

The FR172 Reims Rocket was produced by Reims Aviation in France from the late 1960s to the mid-1970s. It was powered by a Rolls-Royce built, fuel-injected, Continental IO-360-H(B)  engine with a constant-speed propeller. Variants included the FR172E until FR172J.

The Reims Rocket led to Cessna producing the R172K Hawk XP, a model available from 1977 to 1981 from both Wichita and Reims. The Hawk XP was capable of a  cruise speed.

Owners claimed that the increased performance of the "XP" didn't compensate for its increased purchase price and the higher operating costs associated with the larger engine. The aircraft was well accepted for use on floats, however, as the standard 172 is not a strong floatplane, even with only two people on board, while the XP's extra power improves water takeoff performance dramatically.

While numbered and marketed as 172s, the R172J and R172K models are actually certified on the Cessna 175 type certificate.

Turbo Skyhawk JT-A
Model introduced in July 2014 for 2015 customer deliveries, powered by a  Continental CD-155 diesel engine installed by the factory under a supplemental type certificate. Initial retail price in 2014 was $435,000. As a result, the model has an  range, an increase of more than 38% over the standard 172. This model is a development of the proposed and then cancelled Skyhawk TD. Cessna has indicated that the JT-A will be made available in 2016.

In reviewing this new model Paul Bertorelli of AVweb said: "I’m sure Cessna will find some sales for the Skyhawk JT-A, but at $420,000, it’s hard to see how it will ignite much market expansion just because it’s a Cessna. It gives away $170,000 to the near-new Redbird Redhawk conversion which is a lot of change to pay merely for the smell of a new airplane. Diesel engines cost more than twice as much to manufacture as gasoline engines do and although their fuel efficiency gains back some of that investment, if the complete aircraft package is too pricey, the debt service will eat up any savings, making a new aircraft not just unattractive, but unaffordable. I haven’t run the numbers on the JT-A yet, but I can tell from previous analysis that there are definite limits."

The model was certified by both EASA and the FAA in June 2017. It was discontinued in May 2018, due to poor sales as a result of the aircraft's high price, which was twice the price of the same aircraft as a diesel conversion. The aircraft remains available as an STC conversion from Continental Motors, Inc.

Electric-powered 172
In July 2010, Cessna announced it was developing an electrically powered 172 as a proof-of-concept in partnership with Bye Energy. In July 2011, Bye Energy, whose name had been changed to Beyond Aviation, announced the prototype had commenced taxi tests on 22 July 2011 and a first flight would follow soon.  In 2012, the prototype, using Panacis batteries, engaged in multiple successful test flights. The R&D project was not pursued for production.

Canceled model
172TD
On October 4, 2007, Cessna announced its plan to build a diesel-powered model, to be designated the 172 Skyhawk TD ("Turbo Diesel") starting in mid-2008. In July 2013, the 172TD model was canceled due to Thielert's bankruptcy. The aircraft was later refined into the Turbo Skyhawk JT-A, which was certified in June 2014 and discontinued in May 2018.

Simulator company Redbird Flight uses the same engine and reconditioned 172 airframes to produce a similar model, the Redbird Redhawk.

Premier Aircraft Sales also announced in February 2014 that it would offer refurbished 172 airframes equipped with the Continental/Thielert Centurion 2.0 diesel engine.

Military operators
A variant of the 172, the T-41 Mescalero was used as a trainer with the United States Air Force and Army. In addition, the United States Border Patrol uses a fleet of 172s for aerial surveillance along the Mexico-US border.

From 1972 to 2019 the Irish Air Corps used the Reims version for aerial surveillance and monitoring of cash, prisoner and explosive escorts, in addition to army cooperation and pilot training roles.

For T-41 operators, see Cessna T-41 Mescalero.

 FAPA/DAA

 Austrian Air Force 1× 172

 Bolivian Air Force 3× 172K

 Chilean Army 18× R172K (retired)

 Colombian Air Force – To replace Cessna T-41s used for primary training with deliveries from June 2021.

 Ecuadorian Air Force 8× 172F
 Ecuadorian Army 1× 172G

 Guatemalan Air Force 6× 172K

 Honduran Air Force 3

 Indonesian Air Force

 Iraqi Air Force

 Irish Air Corps 8× FR172H, 1× FR172K Five FR172H remained in service until 2019.

 Air Reconnaissance Unit 2

 Lithuanian Air Force 1

 Malagasy Air Force 4× 172M

 Nicaraguan Air Force 7

 Pakistan Air Force 4× 172N

 Philippine Navy 1×172F, 1×172N, 4x172S

 Royal Saudi Air Force 8× F172G, 4× F172H, 4× F172M

 Republic of Singapore Air Force 8× 172K, delivered 1969 and retired 1972.

 Suriname Air Force (One in service for sale)

Accidents and incidents

 On February 13, 1964, Ken Hubbs, second baseman for the Chicago Cubs and winner of the Rookie of the Year Award and the Gold Glove Award, was killed when the Cessna 172 he was flying crashed near Bird Island in Utah Lake.
 On October 23, 1964, David Box, lead singer for The Crickets on their 1960 release version of "Peggy Sue Got Married" and "Don't Cha Know" and later a solo artist, was killed when the Cessna 172 he was aboard crashed in northwest Harris County, Texas, while en route to a performance. Box was the second lead vocalist for The Crickets to die in a plane crash, following Buddy Holly.
 On August 31, 1969, American professional boxer Rocky Marciano was killed when the Cessna 172 in which he was a passenger crashed on approach to an airfield outside Newton, Iowa.
 On September 25, 1978, a Cessna 172, N7711G, and Pacific Southwest Airlines Flight 182, a Boeing 727, collided over San Diego, California. There were 144 fatalities, two in the Cessna 172, 135 on the PSA Flight 182 and seven on the ground.
 On May 28, 1987, a rented Reims Cessna F172P, registered D-ECJB, was used by German teenage pilot Mathias Rust in an unauthorized flight from Helsinki-Malmi Airport through Soviet airspace to land near the Red Square in Moscow, all without being intercepted by Soviet air defense.
 On April 9, 1990, Atlantic Southeast Airlines Flight 2254, an Embraer EMB 120 Brasilia, collided head-on with a Civil Air Patrol Cessna 172, N99501, while en route from Gadsden Municipal Airport to Hartsfield-Jackson Atlanta International Airport. The Cessna crashed, killing two occupants, but the Brasilia made a safe emergency landing.
 On January 5, 2002, high school student Charles J. Bishop stole a Cessna 172, N2371N, and intentionally crashed it into the side of the Bank of America Tower in downtown Tampa, Florida, killing only himself and otherwise causing very little damage.
 On April 6, 2009, a Cessna 172N, C-GFJH, belonging to Confederation College in Thunder Bay, Ontario, Canada, was stolen by a student who flew it into United States airspace over Lake Superior. The 172 was intercepted and followed by NORAD F-16s, finally landing on Highway 60 in Ellsinore, Missouri, after a seven-hour flight. The student pilot, a Canadian citizen born in Turkey, Adam Dylan Leon, formerly known as Yavuz Berke, suffered from depression and was attempting to commit suicide by being shot down, but was instead arrested shortly after landing. On November 3, 2009, he was sentenced to two years in a US federal prison after pleading guilty to all three charges against him: interstate transportation of a stolen aircraft, importation of a stolen aircraft, and illegal entry into the US. College procedures at the time allowed easy access to aircraft and keys were routinely left in them.
 On November 11, 2021, Glen de Vries, co-founder of Medidata Solutions and Blue Origin space tourist, died in the crash of a 172 near Hampton Township, New Jersey.

Specifications (172R)

See also

References

Bibliography

External links

 
 Complete specifications and data for each Cessna 172 model year

172
High-wing aircraft
Single-engined tractor aircraft
Aircraft first flown in 1955
1950s United States civil utility aircraft
1950s United States civil trainer aircraft